Boo is an onomatopoeic word for a loud, startling sound, as an exclamation intended to scare, or as a call of derision (see booing).
 
Boo or BOO may also refer to:

Places
 Boo (Aller), parish in Asturias, Spain
 Boo, standard abbreviation for the constellation Boötes
 Boo, Ghana, a town in Lawra District in the Upper West RegionDeja
 Boo, Guinea, in Nzérékoré Prefecture; see List of schools in Ghana
 Boo, Sweden, locality in Stockholm County
 Bodø Airport in Norway, IATA airport code BOO
 Boo Islands, West Papua, Indonesia

Station
Code for Bogor railway station

People
 Boo (name), a list of people with the given name, nickname or surname
 Betty Boo (born 1970), English singer, songwriter and pop rapper Alison Moira Clarkson
 Gangsta Boo (born 1979), American rapper
 Sabrian "Boo" Sledge, half of the American hip hop duo Boo & Gotti
Ben Okello Oluoch, Kenyan politician and host of the radio program Kogwen gi BOO

Arts, entertainment, and media

Fictional characters
 Boo (character), a ghost character in the Mario series
 Boo (Sonic the Hedgehog character), a ghost character in Sonic the Hedgehog series
 Boo, a hamster belonging to Minsc in Baldur's Gate, and a character in Megatokyo
 Boo, a character in the Malaysian animated television series Boo & Me
 Boo, a character in the manga and anime Crayon Shin-chan
 Boo, a human baby girl in the animated film Monsters, Inc.
 Boo, Carrie Black's nickname in Orange Is the New Black
 Boo! (comic strip), a character in the British comic The Dandy created by Andy Fanton
 Majin Boo, an anime and manga character in Dragon Ball
 Boo Radley, a character in the novel To Kill a Mockingbird and its adaptations
 Boo, the title character in Boo! (TV series)

Films
 Boo (film), a 2005 horror film
 B.O.O.: Bureau of Otherworldly Operations, an animated film
 Boo! (1932 film), a 1932 comedy film
 Boo! (2018 film), a 2018 horror film
 Boo! A Madea Halloween, a 2016 horror comedy film
 Boo 2! A Madea Halloween, a 2017 horror comedy film

Music
 Boo! (album), by Was (Not Was)
 Boo! (band), a South African band
 Born of Osiris, an American heavy metal band

Television
 Boo! (TV series), a 2003–2006 British children's series
 "Boo" (CSI: NY), a 2007 episode
 "Boo" (Dark Angel), a 2001 episode
 "Boo!" (Frasier), a 2004 episode
 "Boo!" (Roseanne), a 1989 episode
 "Boo!" (Space Ghost Coast to Coast), an episode of Space Ghost Coast to Coast

Literature
 The Boo (book), by Pat Conroy

Computing and technology
 Boo (programming language)
 .boo, a binary-to-text encoding system

Languages
Boo dialect, of the Teke-Ebo or Central Teke language, spoken in Congo and the Democratic Republic of the Congo
Boko language (Benin), also called Boo language
Bomu language, also called Boo, or Western Bobo Wule language
Bozo language, ISO 639 code boo, spoken in Mali

Other uses
 Better Off Out, a political campaign
 Black Oxygen Organics, a defunct multi-level marketing company
 Bladder outlet obstruction
 Boo (dog) (2006–2019)
 Boô, a Saxon cattle shed
 "Boo", a term of endearment
 Boo FF, a Swedish football club in Boo, Stockholm
 Boo.com, a clothing company
 Build Own Operate, a form of infrastructure project operating concession

See also
 Big Boo (disambiguation)
 BO2 (disambiguation)
 Boo Boo (disambiguation)
 Boo language (disambiguation)
 Boos (disambiguation)
 Buu (disambiguation)